Henry Huntingdon may refer to:

Henry of Huntingdon, Anglo-Norman historian
Henry Huntingdon (1885–1907) of the Huntingdon Baronets
Henry Hastings, 5th Earl of Huntingdon (1586 – 1643), prominent English nobleman and literary patron
Henry Hastings, 3rd Earl of Huntingdon

See also
Henry E. Huntington, American businessman
Henry S. Huntington, American Presbyterian minister and nudism advocate